Guy Gentile (born July 3, 1976) is an American business executive, entrepreneur, and high-frequency trading expert. He is best known for founding two high-frequency trading firms. In 2012 he was arrested by the FBI for an alleged pump and dump scheme but the charges were dropped 3 days later after he agreed to work as an undercover operative for the FBI.

Career
In 1999 Gentile founded Speedtrader, currently owned by Stock USA Investments, Inc, (formerly Speed Trader, Inc,). Then in 2011 Gentile founded SureTrader, a division of Swiss Americas Securities, Ltd. In less than a year in operation, SureTrader reported more than 100,000 equity transactions daily. Its success prompted a major expansion to meet scaling demands, and the firm set out to increase staff by two hundred percent during March 2012. By 2012 both SureTrader and SpeedTrader were ranked among Barron's top online brokers.

In May 2012, as Suretrader reported averaging 30,000 transactions daily, Gentile then broke ground on Sur Club, 1.2 million-dollar sushi restaurant offering both a club and dining experience. It received more than 500 advance applications for its opening night.

Undercover work with the FBI
Gentile has also appeared in Bloomberg which documented his 2012 arrest by the FBI and immediate decision afterward to become an undercover operative. The FBI claimed Gentile was running a pump and dump scheme, where Gentile allegedly hyped a Mexican gold mine and Kentucky gas drilling company in 2007-2008. In 2016, Gentile was arrested again on the same charges after he stopped cooperating with the FBI but was allowed to go free on $75,000 bail. According to the 2016 indictment prosecuted by U.S. Attorney Paul J. Fishman, Gentile defrauded investors in the pump and dump scheme out of $17.2 million. Gentile was never convicted of any crime, and the U.S. District Court of New Jersey dismissed the indictment shortly after.

Lawsuits
The SEC sued Gentile and sure trader in March 2021 for alleging soliciting U.S. clients from a brokerage in the Bahamas which let American customers bypass pattern day trading restrictions. Gentile countersued the SEC, saying that the SEC should be held in contempt of court for filing the suit against Gentile. Gentile lost the contempt case in March 2022, but currently has a motion pending for sanctions against the SEC and for the case to be dismissed.

In 2019, Guy Gentile's company Mintbroker International Ltd., formerly Swiss America Securities, Ltd (dba SureTrader) voluntarily shut down after it lost its clearing agreement with IB. The Securities Commission of the Bahamas later filed for a court-supervised liquidation.

References

External links 

Living people
1976 births
American stock traders